The 1977 NAIA Soccer Championship was the 19th annual tournament held by the NAIA to determine the national champion of men's college soccer among its members in the United States and Canada.

Quincy (IL) defeated Keene State in the final, 3–0, to claim the Hawks' seventh NAIA national title.

The final was  played in Huntsville, Alabama.

Qualification

The tournament field remained fixed at eight teams. Third-, fifth-, and seventh-placed finals remained in place alongside the national championship match.

Bracket

See also  
 1977 NCAA Division I Soccer Tournament
 1977 NCAA Division II Soccer Championship
 1977 NCAA Division III Soccer Championship

References 

NAIA championships
NAIA
NAIA Soccer Championship